Austin Krajicek and Jeevan Nedunchezhiyan were the defending champions but only Nedunchezhiyan chose to defend his title, partnering Purav Raja. Nedunchezhiyan lost in the semifinals to Marcus Daniell and Leander Paes.

Santiago González and Aisam-ul-Haq Qureshi won the title after defeating Daniell and Paes 6–3, 6–4 in the final.

Seeds

Draw

References

External links
 Main draw

Ilkley Trophy - Men's Doubles